Nikoloz (Georgian: ნიკოლოზ) is a Georgian masculine given name. Diminutives of Nikoloz include Nika and Niko. It is a cognate of the name Nicholas. Notable people with the name include:
Nikoloz "Tato" Baratashvili (1817–1845), Georgian poet 
Nikoloz Basilashvili (born 1992), Georgian tennis player 
Nikoloz Berdzenishvili (1895–1965), Georgian historian and academician
Nikoloz "Nika" Chkheidze (born 1968), Georgian footballer
Nikoloz Cholokashvili (1585–1658), Georgian Orthodox priest, politician and diplomat
Nikoloz Gelashvili (born 1985), Georgian footballer
Nikoloz "Nika" Gilauri (born 1975), Georgian politician, former Prime Minister of Georgia 
Nikoloz Gruzinsky (1783–1861), Georgian prince
Nikoloz Izoria (born 1985), Georgian boxer
Nikoloz "Lasha" Janashia (1931–1982), Georgian historian and academician
Nikoloz "Nika" Janjgava (born 1970), Georgian military colonel and a military historian
Nikoloz "Nika" Kvekveskiri (born 29 May 1992), Georgian footballer 
Nikoloz "Niko" Lekishvili (born 1947), Georgian politician and statesman, former Prime Minister of Georgia  
Nikoloz Memanishvili (born 1979), Georgian conductor, composer and cultural manager
Nikoloz Mnatobishvili (born 1992), Georgian footballer  
Nikoloz "Niko" Muskhelishvili (1891–1976), Georgian-Soviet mathematician, physician and engineer
Nikoloz "Niko" Rurua (1968–2018), Georgian politician 
Nikoloz Shengelaia (1903–1943), Georgian film director
Nikoloz Togonidze (born 1971), Georgian footballer
Nikoloz Tskitishvili (born 1983), Georgian basketball player
Nikoloz "Nika" Vacheishvili (born 1968) Georgian art scholar and politician

Georgian masculine given names